A substance is pyrophoric (from , , 'fire-bearing') if it ignites spontaneously in air at or below  (for gases) or within 5 minutes after coming into contact with air (for liquids and solids). Examples are organolithium compounds and triethylborane. Pyrophoric materials are often water-reactive as well and will ignite when they contact water or humid air. They can be handled safely in atmospheres of argon or (with a few exceptions) nitrogen. Class D fire extinguishers are designated for use in fires involving pyrophoric materials. A related concept is hypergolicity, in which two compounds spontaneously ignite when mixed.

Uses
The creation of sparks from metals is based on the pyrophoricity of small metal particles, and pyrophoric alloys are made for this purpose.  The sparking mechanisms in lighters and various toys, using ferrocerium; starting fires without matches, using a firesteel; the flintlock mechanism in firearms; and spark testing ferrous metals.

Handling

Small amounts of pyrophoric liquids are often supplied in a glass bottle with a polytetrafluoroethylene-lined septum. Larger amounts are supplied in metal tanks similar to gas cylinders, designed so a needle can fit through the valve opening. A syringe, carefully dried and flushed of air with an inert gas, is used to extract the liquid from its container.

When working with pyrophoric solids, researchers often employ a sealed glove box flushed with inert gas. Since these specialized glove boxes are expensive and require specialized and frequent maintenance, many pyrophoric solids are sold as solutions, or dispersions in mineral oil or lighter hydrocarbon solvents, so they can be handled in the atmosphere of the laboratory, while still maintaining an oxygen- and moisture-free environment.  Mildly pyrophoric solids such as lithium aluminum hydride and sodium hydride can be handled in the air for brief periods of time, but the containers must be flushed with inert gas before the material is returned to the container for storage.

Pyrophoric materials

Solids
 White phosphorus
 Alkali metals, especially potassium, rubidium, caesium, including the alloy NaK
 Finely divided metals (iron, aluminium, magnesium, calcium, zirconium, uranium, titanium, tungsten, bismuth, hafnium, thorium, osmium, neodymium)
 Some metals and alloys in bulk form (cerium, plutonium)
 Alkylated metal alkoxides or nonmetal halides (diethylethoxyaluminium, dichloro(methyl)silane)
 Potassium graphite (KC8)
 Metal hydrides (sodium hydride, lithium aluminium hydride, uranium trihydride)
 Partially or fully alkylated derivatives of metal and nonmetal hydrides (diethylaluminium hydride, trimethylaluminium, triethylaluminium, butyllithium), with a few exceptions (i.e. dimethylmercury and tetraethyllead)
 Copper fuel cell catalysts (zinc oxide, aluminium oxide)
 Grignard reagents (compounds of the form RMgX)
 Used hydrogenation catalysts such as palladium on carbon or Raney nickel (especially hazardous because of the adsorbed hydrogen)
 Iron sulfide: often encountered in oil and gas facilities, where corrosion products in steel plant equipment can ignite if exposed to air
 Lead and carbon powders produced from decomposition of lead citrate
 Uranium, as shown in the disintegration of depleted uranium penetrator rounds into burning dust upon impact with their targets; in finely divided form it is readily ignitable, and uranium scrap from machining operations is subject to spontaneous ignition
 Neptunium
 Several compounds of plutonium are pyrophoric, and they cause some of the most serious fires occurring in United States Department of Energy facilities
Petroleum hydrocarbon (PHC) sludge

Liquids 
 Diphosphane
 Metalorganics of main group metals (e.g. aluminium, gallium, indium, zinc, cadmium, etc.)
 Triethylborane
 tert-Butyllithium
 Diethylzinc
 Triethylaluminium
 Linseed oil; rags soaked in linseed oil can self-ignite
Hydrazine is hypergolic with oxidants like dinitrogen tetroxide or hydrogen peroxide, but not truly pyrophoric.

Gases 
 Nonmetal hydrides (arsine, phosphine, diborane, germane, silane)
 Metal carbonyls (dicobalt octacarbonyl, nickel carbonyl)

Explanatory notes

References

External links
US Dept. of Energy Handbook, "Primer on Spontaneous Heating and Pyrophoricity" (archived)

Chemical properties
Firelighting

sv:Självantändning#Pyrofora ämnen
zh:自燃